Jim Boyle (June 9, 1942 – December 23, 2005) was an American former college basketball player and coach. He coached at Saint Joseph's from 1981 to 1990.

Early life and playing career
Boyle grew up in Philadelphia. He attended West Catholic Preparatory High School, where his teammates included Jim Lynam and Herb Magee. As a senior in 1959, he helped lead the team to the city title. Boyle played college basketball at Saint Joseph's under Jack Ramsay.  He led the team in rebounding as a junior, and was named a captain as a senior, averaging 11.6 points per game. Boyle graduated from Saint Joseph's in 1964.

Coaching career
After graduating from Saint Joseph's, Boyle taught in the parochial school system in the Philadelphia area. In 1971, he was hired as an assistant at Widener. Boyle joined the staff at Saint Joseph's in 1973. In 1981, he helped the Hawks reach the Elite Eight.

On May 21, 1981, Boyle was hired as head coach at Saint Joseph's, replacing his high school teammate Jim Lynam, who left to join the Portland Trail Blazers organization. During his first season, the team finished 25–5 and won the East Coast Conference. In 1985, Boyle hired later Saint Joseph's coach Phil Martelli to his staff. During the 1985–86 season, Boyle led the team to a 26–6 record, Atlantic 10 championship, and NCAA Tournament appearance. The 26 wins were at the time a school-record, and Boyle was named Atlantic 10 coach of the year. He was given a ring for the season, which was lost until it was returned to his family in 2017. Boyle announced his resignation from the Hawks on December 22, 1989, effective at the end of the season, and finished with a record of 151–114.

In September 1990, Boyle was hired as an assistant coach for the Denver Nuggets of the NBA. He coached for two seasons under Paul Westhead. Boyle was fired in May 1992, when new coach Dan Issel opted not to retain him.

Personal life and death
Boyle was married to Teresa and had four children, three of whom attended Saint Joseph's. His son, Kevin, played basketball at Harvard but died in the 1990s of a rare form of cancer. Boyle died of lung cancer at his home in Media, Pennsylvania on December 23, 2005, at the age of 63.

His grandson Ryan Daly plays basketball at Saint Joseph's after transferring from Delaware.

References 

1942 births
2005 deaths
American men's basketball coaches
American men's basketball players
Basketball coaches from Pennsylvania
Basketball players from Pennsylvania
Denver Nuggets assistant coaches
People from Media, Pennsylvania
Saint Joseph's Hawks men's basketball coaches
Saint Joseph's Hawks men's basketball players
Widener Pride men's basketball coaches